Nicolae Negrilă (born 23 July 1954) is a Romanian former professional footballer who played for Universitatea Craiova. He earned 28 caps for the Romania national football team, and participated in UEFA Euro 1984.

Honours
Universitatea Craiova
Divizia A: 1973–74, 1979–80, 1980–81
Cupa României: 1976–77, 1977–78, 1980–81, 1982–83

Notes

References

Romania National Team 1980–1989 - Details

1954 births
Living people
People from Dolj County
Romanian footballers
Olympic footballers of Romania
Romania international footballers
UEFA Euro 1984 players
Liga I players
Liga II players
CS Universitatea Craiova players
CSM Jiul Petroșani players
Association football fullbacks